Arkansas Highway 358 (AR 358 and Hwy. 358) is an east–west state highway in Greene County, Arkansas. The route of  runs from Highway 141 east through to Highway 69 in Paragould.

Route description
AR 358 begins at Highway 141 and runs east past the Old Bethel Methodist Church to serve as the northern terminus for Highway 351. Further east the route has a gap at U.S. Route 49 (US 49) and AR 1 in Paragould after intersecting U.S. Route 412 southwest of town. The highway resumes towards the south of this first endpoint before AR 358 terminates at AR 69 in south Paragould.

Major intersections
Mile markers reset at concurrencies.

References

External links

358
Transportation in Greene County, Arkansas